Greenacre Park is a privately owned, publicly accessible vest-pocket park located on East 51st Street between Second and Third Avenues in the Turtle Bay neighborhood of Manhattan, New York City, designed by Hideo Sasaki, former chairman of Harvard’s Dept. of Landscape Arch., in consultation with architect Harmon Goldstone. The park, which is owned by Greenacre Foundation, was a 1971 gift from Abby Rockefeller Mauzé, the philanthropist, the daughter of John D. Rockefeller Jr. and the granddaughter of John D Rockefeller.

The  park was assembled from three lots, which had previously been occupied by a store, a garage, and part of a synagogue.  It features a  waterfall, a trellis with heat lamps for chilly days, chairs and tables, as well as honey locust trees, azaleas, and pansies, which together attract an average of 700 visitors a day.

In 1980, when a planned building would have blocked the park's sunlight, a campaign was launched to block the construction of the building. Then, in May 2017, a city rezoning plan, which would allow the building of taller buildings nearby the park, caused a controversy when the Greenacre Foundation claimed that the taller buildings would put the park in shadow a great deal of time.  A city shadow study indicated that the park would not be adversely affected by the rezoning, but a study commissioned by the Foundation claimed that buildings on six particular sites could put the park completely in the dark; because of this the Foundation called for height limitations on those sites.  , their "Fight for Light" campaign is supported by the Municipal Art Society, Manhattan Borough President Gale Brewer, New Yorkers for Parks, and Daniel R. Garodnick, the city councilman in whose district the park is located.

In 2018, it was listed on the National Register of Historic Places.

See also

List of privately owned public spaces in New York City
National Register of Historic Places listings in Manhattan from 14th to 59th Streets

References

External links

Parks in Manhattan
Turtle Bay, Manhattan
Parks on the National Register of Historic Places in New York City
National Register of Historic Places in Manhattan
Institutions founded by the Rockefeller family
Privately owned public spaces
1971 establishments in New York City